The Arriaga antzokia in Basque or Teatro Arriaga in Spanish is an opera house in Bilbao, Spain. It was built in Neo-baroque style by architect Joaquín Rucoba in 1890, the same architect that built the city hall. It is named after Juan Crisóstomo de Arriaga, known in his time as the "Spanish Mozart".

The theatre was rebuilt in 1985 after severe flooding in August 1983 destroyed it .

See also
 List of opera houses

External links

www.teatroarriaga.com  The history of the theater is recorded on the theater's website

Buildings and structures in Bilbao
Opera houses in Spain
Music venues completed in 1890
Tourist attractions in Bilbao
Theatres completed in 1890
Estuary of Bilbao